Aino Kallio-Ericsson (May 25, 1917, in Mikkeli – May 28, 2018, in Helsinki) was a Finnish architect, most notable for her work on the Lycée franco-finlandais d'Helsinki in 1956.

References 

1917 births
2018 deaths
Finnish architects
Finnish centenarians
Men centenarians
People from Mikkeli